Now Khandan District is a district (bakhsh) in Dargaz County, Razavi Khorasan Province, Iran. At the 2006 census, its population was 11,094, in 2,958 families.  The district has one city: Now Khandan.   The district has two rural districts (dehestan): Dorungar Rural District and Shahrestaneh Rural District.

References 

Districts of Razavi Khorasan Province
Dargaz County